The 2022–23 season season will be the 145th season of competitive association football and 10th season in the Scottish Professional Football League played by Kilmarnock Football Club, a professional football club based in Kilmarnock, Ayrshire, Scotland. Their 1st-place finish in the Scottish Championship in 2021–22 means it will be their first season back in the Scottish Premiership after spending one year in the second tier. The 2022–23 season will run from 1 July 2022 to 30 June 2023.

Overview

Results and fixtures

Pre-season

Premiership

Scottish Cup

League Cup

Club statistics

Competition Overview

League table

League Cup table

Squad statistics

Transfers

Transfers in

Transfers out

References

Kilmarnock F.C. seasons
Kilmarnock